This list of mines in Bulgaria is subsidiary to the list of mines article and lists working, defunct and future mines in the country and is organised by the primary mineral output. For practical purposes stone, marble and other quarries may be included in this list.

Coal
Troyanovo-1 coal mine
Troyanovo-3 coal mine

Copper
Assarel mine
Elatsite mine

Gold
Chelopech mine

Salt
Mirovo mine

References

Bulgaria